Deon Slabbert (born 4 May 2000) is a South African rugby union player for the  in the Currie Cup. His regular position is lock.

Slabbert was named in the  side for the 2022 Currie Cup Premier Division.

References

South African rugby union players
Living people
Rugby union locks
SWD Eagles players
Pumas (Currie Cup) players
2000 births